Lyudmila Igorevna Stanukinas (Russian: Людмила Игоревна Станукинас; 25 November 1930 – 8 July 2020) was a Soviet documentary filmmaker. She was an Honored Artist of the RSFSR (1989). She was member of the Union of Cinematographers of the USSR. Stanukinas died on 8 July 2020 in Israel.

Having previously worked for the company "Lenfilm" in the 1950's, Stanukinas had first gone to a film university, but instead graduated from the Leningrad Institute of Foreign Languages with a degree in English. Despite this, her focus remained on film and she joined the Leningrad Documentary Film Studio in 1958.

References

Kazakhstani documentary film directors
Kazakhstani women film directors
Soviet filmmakers
1930 births
2020 deaths
People from Almaty
Place of death missing